Enea Bastianini (born 30 December 1997), nicknamed "La Bestia" (The Beast), is an Italian Grand Prix motorcycle racer, riding for Ducati Lenovo Team in the MotoGP class. He won the 2020 Moto2 World Championship.

Career

Early career
Born in Rimini, Bastianini first rode a minibike aged 3 years and 3 months: hence his racing number, 33. After a successful career in minibike racing, Bastianini raced successfully in various categories, including the Honda HIRP Trophy 100cc, the MiniGP 70cc Italian Championship and the Honda RS125 Trophy, where he finished as champion during the 2012 season. In 2013, Bastianini competed in the Red Bull MotoGP Rookies Cup, where he took two victories en route to a fourth-place finish in the championship. Bastianini also took his first steps in Moto3, participating in five races of the Italian Championship.

Moto3 World Championship
In 2014, Bastianini made his debut in the Moto3 World Championship riding for Team GO&FUN Moto3. Bastianini scored his first points in his second start, finishing 13th at the Circuit of the Americas in Texas, commencing a run of four consecutive points-scoring finishes; he took top ten placings at the Argentine, Spanish and French Grands Prix. After failing to finish his home race at Mugello, Bastianini took his first podium with a second-place finish in Catalunya; he added another second-place finish in the Czech Republic and a third-place finish in the following race in Great Britain. Bastianini finished the season ninth in the riders' championship.

In 2015, Bastianini emerged as runaway leader Danny Kent's nearest challenger, taking five podium finishes – including four second places – and two pole positions in the first eleven races of the season. At Misano in September, Bastianini took his first race victory; having started from pole position, Bastianini was part of the five-rider lead battle for the whole race, and took the race win after a final-lap pass on Miguel Oliveira. Bastianini finished the season in third place in the final championship standings.

In 2016, Bastianini continued to race in the Moto3 class with Gresini Racing Moto3. He finished the season as the championship runner-up, taking 177 points with 6 podiums and a win at Motegi.

Moto2 World Championship

Italtrans Racing Team (2019–2020)

2019
In 2019, he joined Italtrans Racing Team and finished the season in 10th place taking 97 points with 1 podium.

2020
He finished the 2020 Moto2 season as the world champion, taking 205 points with 3 wins and 7 podiums. At the Austrian Grand Prix, Bastianini crashed into turn 1, which let his bike stranded on the track, until Aspar rider Hafizh Syahrin did not notice, hit Bastianini's bike, create a massive pile-up and pulled out the red flag, neither rider were injured after the accident.

MotoGP World Championship

Avintia Esponsorama Racing (2021)

He signed with Esponsorama Racing for the 2021 MotoGP season and was partnered with Moto2 rival and fellow compatriot Luca Marini. Both Bastianini and Marini rode two-year-old specification Ducati GP19 bikes the whole season. Bastianini scored points consistently during the season, before getting his then best result in Aragon in 6th position, followed by a 3rd place finish in Misano, a repeat 6th place finish again in COTA, and a repeated 3rd place finish again at the Emilia Romagna Grand Prix in Misano during the last lap. Bastianini finished the season 11th in the riders' standings with 102 points.

Gresini Racing MotoGP (2022) 

Bastianini won the first race of the 2022 MotoGP season, the 2022 Qatar Grand Prix and became the championship leader. Gresini Racing and Bastianini made history by winning with a 2021-specification Ducati Desmosedici GP21. After mid-pack results in Indonesia and Argentina, where he took P11 and P10 respectively, he took his second win at the Circuit of the Americas in Austin. This was followed by a DNF in Portugal and P8 in Jerez. At the French Grand Prix in Le Mans, Bastianini took another win, after overtaking both factory Ducatis to return to the top step of the podium. This win meant he was just eight points adrift of championship leader Fabio Quartararo after seven rounds. He returned again to the podium with a 2nd place finish in at the San Marino Grand Prix. Bastianini then took his fourth win of the season at the Aragón Grand Prix, then another 2nd place finish at the Malaysian Grand Prix.

Ducati Lenovo Team (from 2023) 
Bastianini will switch to Ducati Lenovo Team for the 2023 MotoGP World Championship, replacing Jack Miller and partnering Francesco Bagnaia.

Career statistics

Red Bull MotoGP Rookies Cup

Races by year
(key) (Races in bold indicate pole position, races in italics indicate fastest lap)

Grand Prix motorcycle racing

By season

By class

Races by year
(key) (Races in bold indicate pole position, races in italics indicate fastest lap)

References

External links

 
 

1997 births
Living people
Moto3 World Championship riders
Italian motorcycle racers
Sportspeople from Rimini
Moto2 World Championship riders
MotoGP World Championship riders
Esponsorama Racing MotoGP riders
Gresini Racing MotoGP riders
21st-century Italian people
Moto2 World Riders' Champions